Daniel Kane may refer to:

 Daniel Kane (mathematician) (born 1986), American assistant professor in mathematics
 Daniel Kane (linguist), Australian linguist, an expert in Jurchen and Khitan languages
 Dan Kane, American investigative journalist

See also
Daniel Cane, businessman